Gaam (Gaahmg), also known as Ingessana, (Me/Mun)Tabi, Kamanidi, or Mamedja/Mamidza, is an Eastern Sudanic language spoken by the Ingessana people in the Tabi Hills in eastern Sudan, near Ethiopia. It was considered an isolate within Eastern Sudanic until the other Eastern Jebel languages were discovered in the late 20th century. Dialects are Soda (Tao), Kukur (Gor), Kulang (Kulelek, Bau), Buwahg (Buek).

An early record of this language is a short wordlist dated February 1883 by Juan Maria Schuver. His informant came from the east side of the Tabi Hills, but was hard to understand because he was chewing tobacco.

Phonology

Consonants 
There are 21 distinct consonant phonemes. The fricative, nasal, lateral and rhotic consonants also distinguish length.

Vowels 
There are six distinct vowel phonemes. All six can also occur in sequential (and thus lengthened) form but may change phonetic quality. Stirtz (2012) proposes the following system:

Tone 
Gaam is a tonal language. There are three level tones, High, Mid and Low, which can be combined to form rising and falling tones. A total of nine tone melodies is possible, all of them contrastive.

References

Bibliography

External links
Gaam basic lexicon at the Global Lexicostatistical Database

Eastern Jebel languages